Evgeniko (before 1954: Δελήτιον – Delitio) is a village in the northeastern part of the Evros regional unit in Greece. It is located at the foot of low hills by the side of the river Erythropotamos. Evgeniko is part of the community of Mani within the municipality of Didymoteicho. It is 3.5 km south of Sitochori, 5 km northwest of Mani, 16 km northwest of Didymoteicho and 17 km southwest of Orestiada. Its population was recorded as 85 in the 2011 census.

Population

History
Originally, the village was located 2 km north, at the Palaiochoria ("old village") site. Its Ottoman name was Delimosluk (Ντελίμοσλουκ) which was eventually corrupted to Delimis (Ντελίμις). The new village was founded in 1922 and renamed to Delitio (Δελήτιο). Due to the benefaction of the shipping magnate Eugenios Eugenidis, who provided for the village's water supply, it was later given its current name.

See also

List of settlements in the Evros regional unit

External links
Evgeniko on GTP Travel Pages

References

Populated places in Evros (regional unit)